Julien Bayle (born February 1976 in France) is a French electronic musician and music software trainer.

Biography
Bayle was born in the South of France. He studied Biology and Computer Sciences in Marseille. During his studies, he explored minimal techno, influenced especially by Carl Craig and Surgeon.

His work explores software including Cubase 1.0 and Generator (the precursor to Reaktor). His first live solo shows took place in early 2003. He designed and built the protodeck midi controller, (based on the open-source hardware framework MIDIBOX) in 2008.

He founded and leads his own studio, Julien Bayle Studio. He provides Ableton Live Suite, Max for Live, and Max/MSP advanced training courses, and also leads workshops in Europe in art and design schools. He is an Ableton Certified Trainer.

Musical approach 
Bayle is often described as a minimalist experimental musician when he plays his ambient music performance or when he plays more syncopated IDM.
His influences include Autechre and Aphex Twin, and for his ambient music by Brian Eno and Pete Namlook.

Selected discography

EP 
 Part EP, 2010
 Bits#0, 2011
 Bits#1, 2011

References

External links 
 
 Julien Bayle Studio
 Julien Bayle's discography at Discogs
 Interview Julien Bayle: Uncertainty, Fragility, Max, and Live
 Interview Beyond Form: A Partnership of Spiritual Vision and Brutalist Flesh at Elastic Arts
 Audio interview MATTER by Radio Grenouille
 Interview Discussion with Lucia Udvardyova / SHAPE Network

1976 births
Living people
French electronic musicians
Intelligent dance musicians
French experimental musicians